Church of St. Joseph of Arimathea, originally known as Worthington Memorial Chapel, is a historic Episcopal church at 2172 Saw Mill River Road in Greenburgh, Westchester County, New York.  It was designed by architect Richard M. Upjohn (1828 – 1903) and built in 1883 in an eclectic Victorian Gothic Revival style. It was built in four phases: The original 1883 chapel, the 1901 addition, the addition in 1953 of a ground floor meeting room, and an enlargement and remodeling of the 1953 addition in 1990.  The original chapel and 1901 addition are built of random-coursed, rock faced ashlar with corner buttresses, and high pitched gable roof with low parapets.  The chapel is cruciform in plan and features a three-story bell tower with large segmental arched opening and a conical roof.  A large three-part stained glass window and smaller three part windows in the two transepts are attributed to John La Farge (1835 – 1910) and installed around 1883.  It was originally built by the family of pump manufacturer Henry Rossiter Worthington (1817-1880) as a chapel and crypt.

It was added to the National Register of Historic Places in 2002.

See also
National Register of Historic Places listings in southern Westchester County, New York

References

External links
Church of St. Joseph of Arimathea website

Episcopal church buildings in New York (state)
Churches on the National Register of Historic Places in New York (state)
National Register of Historic Places in Westchester County, New York
Gothic Revival church buildings in New York (state)
Churches completed in 1883
19th-century Episcopal church buildings
Churches in Westchester County, New York
Richard Michell Upjohn church buildings
Greenburgh, New York
1883 establishments in New York (state)